Oahe Downstream Recreation Area is a state recreation area in Stanley County, South Dakota in the United States. The recreation area is named for being immediately downstream of the Oahe Dam and Lake Oahe, a U.S. Army Corps of Engineers dam and reservoir. The recreation area is located along the Missouri River and is popular for camping, fishing and other water-based recreation. The area is located about 7 miles upstream of Pierre - the state capitol. The recreation area was constructed by the U.S. Army Corps of Engineers following construction of Oahe Dam, and legislation passed by Congress transferred ownership of the recreation area to the State of South Dakota in 2002.

References

External links
 Oahe Downstream Recreation Area - South Dakota Department of Game, Fish, and Parks
 Oahe Dam - U.S. Army Corps of Engineers

Protected areas of Stanley County, South Dakota
Protected areas of South Dakota
State parks of South Dakota